"Blow the Chinks Down!" is a Sailor Steve Costigan short story by Robert E. Howard.  It was originally published in the October 1931 issue of Action Stories.

References

External links

 List of stories and publication details at Howard Works

Short stories by Robert E. Howard
Pulp stories
1931 short stories
Short stories about boxing
Works originally published in Action Stories
Short stories set in Hong Kong